Constituency NA-265 (Sibi-cum-Kohlu-cum-Dera Bugti) was a constituency for the National Assembly of Pakistan.

Election 2002 

General elections were held on 10 Oct 2002. Haider Bugti of Jamhoori Wattan Party won by 92,555 votes.

Election 2008 

General elections were held on 18 Feb 2008. Mir Ahmadan Khan Bugti of PML-Q won by 56,715 votes.

Election 2013 

General elections were held on 11 May 2013. Mir Dostain Khan Domki of PML-N won by 17,894 votes and became the member of National Assembly.

References

External links 
Election result's official website

NA-265
Abolished National Assembly Constituencies of Pakistan